Vollen may refer:

Places
Vollen, Asker, a village in Asker municipality, Akershus county, Norway
Vollen, Oppland, a village in Vestre Slidre municipality, Oppland county, Norway
Vollen, Troms, a village in Tromsø municipality, Troms county, Norway
Vollen, Vestfold, a village in Nøtterøy municipality, Vestfold county, Norway
Vollen, part of the Gangsås neighborhood in the town of Harstad, Troms county, Norway

People
Iselin Vollen Steiro, a Norwegian fashion model from Harstad, Norway
Laurie Lola Vollen, a scholar and human rights activist

Other
Vollen Ungdomslag, a sports club in Vollen, Akershus